Leotrim Pajaziti (born 8 July 1993) is a Serbian-born Albanian professional footballer who plays for Belgian club Rebecquoise as an offensive midfielder.

Career

Early career
Pajaziti was born in the town in Preševo in FR Yugoslavia but he moved as a young child to Sweden, where he began to play football for local amateur teams. He moved back to Serbia where he joined the local ethnic Albanian team KF Tërnoci (FK Trnovac) in Veliki Trnovac. He moved up the ranks within the club and he eventually became an important member of the first team alongside the likes of Gjelbrim Taipi and Arbnor Fejzullahu in the Pčinjska Liga, scoring 19 goals for the club in total.

Teuta Durrës
Pajaziti joined Albanian Superliga side Teuta Durrës in January 2012, linking up with the team at their winter training camp in Antalya, Turkey.

Belgium
In 2014, Pajaziti moved to Belgium to play amateur football for Racing Jet Wavre and later Tienen. In summer 2019 he left Meux, whom he had joined from Tienen a year earlier,  for Rebecquoise.

References

External links

1993 births
Living people
People from Preševo
Albanians in Serbia
Association football midfielders
Serbian footballers
Albanian footballers
KF Teuta Durrës players
FC Drita players
Racing Jet Wavre players
K.V.K. Tienen-Hageland players
Kategoria Superiore players
Football Superleague of Kosovo players
Serbian expatriate footballers
Albanian expatriate footballers
Serbian expatriate sportspeople in Albania
Expatriate footballers in Kosovo
Albanian expatriate sportspeople in Kosovo
Expatriate footballers in Belgium
Serbian expatriate sportspeople in Belgium
Albanian expatriate sportspeople in Belgium
R.U.S. Rebecquoise players
R.F.C. Meux players